Thomas Kihlström (born 11 December 1948) is a former badminton player from Sweden known for his agility, tactical astuteness, and coolness under pressure. Though an impressive singles player early in his career, his greatest successes came in doubles.

Career
Kihlström won the 1983 IBF World Championships in mixed doubles with Nora Perry. He also won 16 medals at the European Championships, two of them in men's singles, two in mixed doubles, five in men's doubles and 7 in team competition. He shared two All-England men's doubles titles, one with Bengt Fröman in 1976 and the other with Stefan Karlsson in 1983. He also shared the All-England mixed doubles title with Nora Perry in 1983. From 1973 to 1988 Kihlström captured a total of twenty-four events at the Swedish National Championships. Kihlström competed during an era in which world class badminton became increasingly event-specialized. His skill as an "all-arounder" is demonstrated by the facts that he is the only player to have won medals in all three events, men's singles, men's doubles, and mixed doubles at the BWF World Championships, and is the only man to have won each of these three events at the Japan Open.

Achievements

World Championships 
Men's singles

Men's doubles

Mixed doubles

World Cup 
Mixed doubles

World Games 
Men's doubles

Mixed doubles

European Championships 
Men's singles

Men's doubles

Mixed doubles

International tournaments 
Men's singles

Men's doubles

Mixed doubles

References 

1948 births
Living people
Swedish male badminton players
World Games medalists in badminton
World Games gold medalists
World Games silver medalists
Competitors at the 1981 World Games